The following lists events that happened in 1926 in the Imperial State of Persia.

Incumbents
 Shah: Reza Shah
 Prime Minister: Mohammad-Ali Foroughi (until June 13), Mostowfi ol-Mamalek (starting June 13)

Events
 April 25 – Rezā Khan was crowned Shah of Persia under the name "Pahlevi".

Births
 October 15 – Reza Seyed-Hosseini, translator of French language literature

References

 
1920s in Iran
Years of the 20th century in Iran
Persia
Persia